Angus McLean (20 September 1925 – 1 July 1979) was a football player and club manager.

A solidly built centre-half who began his career with Aberystwyth Town, McLean moved on to Hilton Main before joining Wolverhampton Wanderers as an amateur in 1939.

McLean turned professional in November 1942 and helped Wolves to top six finishes in each of the first three post-war seasons. A knee injury kept him out of the team for most of the 1948–49 season and so he missed out on a place in Wolves' 1949 FA Cup winning side.

McLean left Wolves in May 1951 to become player-manager at Aberystwyth Town, subsequently joining Bromsgrove Rovers as a player. In May 1953, McLean joined Bury as player-coach, moving to Crewe Alexandra as a player the following June.

After leaving Crewe he coached a number of non-league sides before taking over from Brian Clough as manager of Hartlepools United in May 1967. The following season, he led Hartlepool to their first ever promotion, but they were relegated after just one season. Despite relegation, McLean remained in charge, but was sacked in April 1970 when Hartlepool finished in the bottom four and were forced to seek re-election to the Football League.

McLean managed Bromsgrove Rovers between 1973 and 1975, after which time he worked as a scout until his death in 1979.

References

External links
 

1925 births
1979 deaths
Footballers from Edinburgh
Scottish footballers
Wolverhampton Wanderers F.C. players
Bromsgrove Rovers F.C. players
Bury F.C. players
Crewe Alexandra F.C. players
English Football League players
Scottish football managers
Hartlepool United F.C. managers
Aberystwyth Town F.C. managers
Association football fullbacks